Hecyra marmorata is a species of beetle in the family Cerambycidae. It was described by Stephan von Breuning in 1972. It is known from the Central African Republic.

References

Endemic fauna of the Central African Republic
Crossotini
Beetles described in 1972